Aura Kenny Dunn (born November 15, 1971) is an American Republican Party politician who has represented the 25th Legislative District in the New Jersey General Assembly from November 25, 2019 until January 14, 2020. She was sworn in again on February 3, 2020.

She served in the Assembly as the Assistant Minority Whip.

Education and early career
Dunn earned her bachelor's degree in sociology at the State University of New York at Buffalo and was awarded a graduate degree in public administration from George Washington University. Dunn also holds a certificate in Mediation.

She was a budget analyst on education policy for the U.S. Senate Appropriations Committee from 1997 to 2000, and a policy advisor for the House Veterans Affairs Committee. Dunn later was a lobbyist for America’s Public Television Stations, Sesame Street and Mister Rogers’ Neighborhood and advocated on behalf of these clients to the U.S. Senate. She was the District Director for Rep. Rodney Frelinghuysen (NJ-11) from 2016 to his retirement in 2019.

New Jersey Assembly 
Dunn ran for assembly in the 2019 Republican primary losing to Anthony M. Bucco and Brian Bergen.

In September 2019, State Senator Anthony R. Bucco died. His son Assemblyman Anthony M. Bucco was appointed to the Senate seat. After his Senate appointment, Bucco's name was still on the ballot for his Assembly seat, and won re-election to the Assembly in the November 2019 general election. Dunn then won a special election convention for Bucco's Assembly seat. She was sworn in on November 25, 2019, serving only until the end of the legislative session on January 14, 2020. However, Dunn was selected in another special convention for that seat on February 1, 2020. She was sworn in again on February 3, 2020.

Committee assignments 
Committee assignments for the 2022—23 session are:
Budget
Commerce and Economic Development
Women and Children

25th District 

Each of the 40 districts in the New Jersey Legislature has one representative in the New Jersey Senate and two members in the New Jersey General Assembly. The representatives from the 25th District for the 2022—23 Legislative Session are:
Senator Anthony M. Bucco (R)
Assemblyman Brian Bergen (R)
Assemblywoman Aura K. Dunn (R)

Electoral history

New Jersey Assembly

Personal life

Dunn lives in Mendham with her husband and their three children.

Dunn served on the boards of Morris Habitat for Humanity and Morris County Mental Health Addictions Services. She volunteers as a JBWS-certified domestic violence crisis response team member for local police departments. Since 2010, her family has hosted a New York City child each summer through the Fresh Air Fund program.

References

External links
Legislative webpage

Living people
George Washington University alumni
Republican Party members of the New Jersey General Assembly
People from Mendham Borough, New Jersey
Politicians from Morris County, New Jersey
University at Buffalo alumni
1971 births